Allardiana is a monotypic genus of beetles belonging to the family Staphylinidae. The only species is Allardiana katangana.

References

Staphylinidae
Monotypic beetle genera